Rob Todd (born October 23, 1963) is an American entrepreneur and former member of the Houston City Council from 1996 to 2002. Todd, a Republican, was a member of the Houston City Council from 1996 to 2002, representing the eastern edge of Houston. His district included the Johnson Space Center, William P. Hobby Airport, the Houston Ship Channel, and Lake Houston. He chaired the Regulatory Affairs Committee, the Charter Committee, and the Rail Committee. He was also a member of the Aviation, Ethics, and Finance Committees. At the time of his initial election, Todd was the youngest person ever elected to Houston City Council at the age of 31 and has been a mainstay in the business community. 

Todd is currently Chairman of the Tower Permit Commission for southeast Texas.

Personal life
Todd was born into a military family in Kirksville, Missouri, but spent time in Oregon, Kansas and Hawaii. He moved to Texas and attended the University of Texas at Austin where he received his Bachelor of Arts degree in Latin American Studies. After his undergraduate, Todd received a Doctorate of Jurisprudence from the South Texas College of Law. He continues to teach there as an adjunct professor with courses in election law and passage of legislation.

On July 30, 2015 Rob Todd became a member of this year's Partnership for Baylor College of Medicine. The partnership is the college's largest volunteer organization and its mission is to "create and apply science and discoveries to further education, healthcare and community service locally and globally."

Political career

As a City of Houston councilmember Todd opposed the expenditure of public funds on the installation of light rail without a public vote, and in 2001 filed suit against the Metropolitan Transit Authority of Harris County, to block the project and force a referendum.  He argued that taxpayers should be allowed to consider the merits of light rail. He succeeded and as a result, METRORail was put to a public vote. Ultimately, Metro enacted a public policy position that it should not initiate major light rail projects in the greater Houston area unless there was strong evidence that they would reduce air pollution or result in a major reduction in traffic congestion. This position was also supported by United States Congressman Tom DeLay. 

Todd strongly promoted "family values", and sternly criticized President Bill Clinton's affair with Monica Lewinsky. He even took extreme measures to shut down the store "Condoms Galore": When a vice-squad raid he requested failed to find any illegal activities at the store, Todd sent in city health inspectors, hoping to find the store selling edible panties without a food license.

In his capacity as chairman of the Regulatory Affairs Committee, Todd supported the passage of ordinances aimed at combating vagrancy and designed to restrict behavior such as loitering, begging, and burrowing through trash.

Todd's electronic access card to City Hall was revoked in 1997 when he snuck into the Council chamber and wrapped the Mayor's chair with leftover "Free Kingwood" banners from an anti-annexation rally for that locality.

In a recent article from Houston society magazine Lights, Camera, Action, Rob Todd expressed his intention to run for mayor of Houston one day. As part of the magazine's Trailblazers series which features successful entrepreneurs, Todd said, "I get encouraged to run all the time. For now, my kids need my full attention so it will have to wait. Eventually...the time will be right."

Career after politics
Rob Todd continues to support the South Texas College of Law as an adjunct professor. He currently teaches courses on election law and the passage of legislation. In 2003, after leaving city council, Rob Todd founded Amplified Solutions, a real-estate  and telecommunications development firm that designs, implements, finances and manages distributed antenna systems, which are advanced antenna systems that support wireless reception for large-scale venues. Amplified Solutions has successfully designed and implemented systems for the Chicago White Sox, Detroit Red Wings, Detroit Pistons, Milwaukee Bucks, Memorial Hermann Healthcare Systems, the Detroit Energy Music Theater and W Hotels. In 2015, Amplified Solutions was appointed to the Houston Business Journal's Fast 100 List and subsequently interviewed. The list commemorates the 100 fastest growing companies in Houston.

Though he no longer practices, Rob Todd served as an attorney for 27-year-old Ariana Venegas in 2009 during a high-profile sexual harassment lawsuit against Harris County District Court judge Donald Jackson. Jackson was convicted of offering to dismiss Venegas's case in exchange for sex. 

Todd is an adjunct professor of law at the South Texas College of Law, where he teaches a class on the legislative process.

Todd's son Robert lost his hearing as an infant due to meningitis.  Todd brought a lawsuit against several movie distributors and producers under the Americans With Disabilities Act, with Robert—then in the ninth grade—as the primary plaintiff.  The suit sought to force the companies to provide more films with captioning for the hearing-impaired.
Todd succeeded in efforts to provide closed captioning on Houston's government-information Government-access television (GATV) channel so that weekly televised city council meetings would be accessible to the hearing-impaired. He also succeeded in persuading the Hobby Center and the Houston Rodeo to add closed captioning to their performances.

, Todd serves as the Chairman of the Tower Permit Commission, which has jurisdiction over towers within a  area of southeast Texas.

	He was recently appointed by Mayor Annise Parker to re-write a comprehensive ordinance that governs cell tower and coverage for the City of Houston.

References

Living people
1963 births
University of Texas at Austin College of Liberal Arts alumni
South Texas College of Law alumni
Houston City Council members
People from Kirksville, Missouri